Granville (1933–1951) was an American Hall of Fame Thoroughbred racehorse. He was the leading American colt of his generation, winning the Belmont Stakes and being voted Horse of the Year.

Background
Owned and bred by prominent horseman William Woodward, Sr. at his Belair Stud in Bowie, Maryland, Granville was sired by U.S. Triple Crown winner Gallant Fox and out of the mare Gravita.

Racing career

1935: two-year-old season

Racing at age two under future Hall of Fame trainer Sunny Jim Fitzsimmons,  Granville won one of seven starts with his most noteworthy finish in a major race coming in the Champagne Stakes, in which he finished third.

1936: three-year-old season
The following year, in the run-up to the 1936 Kentucky Derby, Granville finished a strong second to Teufel in the Wood Memorial Stakes. In the Derby, won by Bold Venture, shortly after the start Granville threw jockey James Stout and as such finished last in the fourteen-horse field. He then finished second by a nose to Bold Venture in the Preakness Stakes. In the Belmont Stakes in June, he won by a nose in a photo finish from Mr. Bones. Granville also won the 1936 Arlington Classic at 1¼ miles plus much longer races, such as the 1⅝ mile Lawrence Realization Stakes, and he defeated the great Discovery by eight lengths in the 1¾ mile Saratoga Cup. He was named American Horse of the Year in a poll of journalists conducted by Turf and Sport Digest magazine.

Stud record
Retired from racing after an ankle injury, Granville finished the year with seven wins and three seconds in his eleven starts and was voted U.S. Champion 3-Yr-Old Colt and the most prestigious honor in American Thoroughbred racing, Horse of the Year. Sent to horse breeding duty at his owners' stud farm, he was less than successful as a sire, with his last issue foaled in 1949.

Honors
In 1997, Granville was inducted in the United States' National Museum of Racing and Hall of Fame.

Pedigree

References

 Granville at the United States' National Museum of Racing and Hall of Fame
 Granville's pedigree and partial racing stats

1933 racehorse births
1951 racehorse deaths
Racehorses bred in Maryland
Racehorses trained in the United States
Belmont Stakes winners
American Thoroughbred Horse of the Year
United States Thoroughbred Racing Hall of Fame inductees
Thoroughbred family 2-e